Coal Run may refer to:

Coal Run, Ohio
Coal Run (Archers Fork tributary), a stream in Ohio
Coal Run (North Branch Buffalo Creek), a stream in Union County, Pennsylvania
Coal Run (novel), a novel by Tawni O'Dell
Coal Run (Shamokin Creek), a stream in Northumberland County, Pennsylvania
Coal Run Village, Kentucky, a city in Pike County, Kentucky, United States